Washington Park is a census-designated place (CDP) in Broward County, Florida, United States. Its population was 1,948 at the 2020 census.

Geography
Washington Park is located at  (26.130613, -80.179042).

According to the United States Census Bureau, the CDP has a total area of 1.1 km (0.4 mi2), of which 1.0 km (0.4 mi2) is land and 0.1 km (0.04 mi2) (4.88%) is water.

Demographics

As of the census of 2000, there were 1,257 people, 410 households, and 298 families residing in the CDP. The population density was 1,213.3/km (3,162.1/mi2). There were 470 housing units at an average density of 453.7/km (1,182.3/mi2). The racial makeup of the CDP was 0.08% White, 98.17% African American, 0.40% Native American, 0.08% Asian, and 1.27% from two or more races. Hispanic or Latino of any race were 0.64% of the population.

There were 410 households, out of which 30.0% had children under the age of 18 living with them, 32.4% were married couples living together, 31.2% had a female householder with no husband present, and 27.1% were non-families. 22.0% of all households were made up of individuals, and 7.3% had someone living alone who was 65 years of age or older. The average household size was 3.07 and the average family size was 3.52.

In the CDP, the population was spread out, with 30.8% under the age of 18, 8.4% from 18 to 24, 27.6% from 25 to 44, 21.6% from 45 to 64, and 11.7% who were 65 years of age or older. The median age was 35 years. For every 100 females, there were 89.9 males. For every 100 females age 18 and over, there were 86.3 males.

The median income for a household in the CDP was $23,516, and the median income for a family was $26,528. Males had a median income of $21,583 versus $18,581 for females. The per capita income for the CDP was $11,359. About 24.9% of families and 28.5% of the population were below the poverty line, including 48.5% of those under age 18 and 19.5% of those age 65 or over.

As of 2000, English was the first language for 97.82% of all residents, while Spanish was the mother tongue for 2.17% of the population.

References

Census-designated places in Broward County, Florida
Census-designated places in Florida